Alena Kaufman (Алена Владимировна Кауфман) is a Russian paralympic biathlete and skier who won two gold medals at the Sochi Paralympic Games for 6, and 10 km race respectively. On March 12, 2014, she was congratulated by the Russian President Vladimir Putin for winning a bronze medal in 1 km cross-country skiing. Previously, she also was a gold medalist at the 2006 and bronze one at the 2010 Winter Paralympics.

References

1987 births
Living people
Paralympic biathletes of Russia
Russian female cross-country skiers
Russian female biathletes
Biathletes at the 2006 Winter Paralympics
Biathletes at the 2010 Winter Paralympics
Biathletes at the 2014 Winter Paralympics
Cross-country skiers at the 2006 Winter Paralympics
Cross-country skiers at the 2010 Winter Paralympics
Cross-country skiers at the 2014 Winter Paralympics
Paralympic bronze medalists for Russia
Paralympic gold medalists for Russia
Paralympic silver medalists for Russia
Paralympic medalists in cross-country skiing
Medalists at the 2014 Winter Paralympics
21st-century Russian women